The 2015 Kebbi State gubernatorial election was the 7th gubernatorial election of Kebbi State. Held on April 11, 2015, the All Progressives Congress nominee Abubakar Atiku Bagudu won the election, defeating Bello Sarkin Yaki of the People's Democratic Party.

APC primary
APC candidate, Abubakar Atiku Bagudu clinched the party ticket. The APC primary election was held in 2014.

PDP primary
PDP candidate, Bello Sarkin Yaki clinched the party ticket. The PDP primary election was held in 2014.

Results 
A total of 17 candidates contested in the election. Abubakar Atiku Bagudu from the All Progressives Congress won the election, defeating Bello Sarkin Yaki from the People's Democratic Party. Registered voters was 1,454,369, accredited voters was 873,542, 34,875 votes was cancelled, votes cast was 813,239, valid votes was 778,364. The winner, Abubakar Atiku Bagudu won in 19 out of 21 Local Government Areas in the State, Bello Sarkin Yaki won just 2 Local Government Areas.

References 

Kebbi State gubernatorial elections
Kebbi gubernatorial
April 2015 events in Nigeria